Electra ( Ilektra) is a 1962 Greek film based on the play Electra, written by Euripides. It was directed by Michael Cacoyannis, as the first installment of his "Greek tragedy" trilogy, followed by The Trojan Women in 1971 and Iphigenia in 1977. It starred Irene Papas in the lead role as Elektra, and Giannis Fertis as Orestis.

Plot 
King Agamemnon is murdered by his wife Clytemnestra and her lover and Agememnon's cousin and childhood playmate Aegisthus. Of Agamemnon and Clytemnestra's children, Orestes goes into exile and safety while Electra is confined to the palace for some years and then forced to marry a peasant to disgrace her and any children.

Some years later, Electra seeks revenge with the help of her brother Orestes and their cousin Pylades. Orestes and Pylades go to a festival to Bacchus hosted by Aegisthus and, when Aegisthus challenges Orestes to a mock knife fight, Orestes uses the opportunity to kill him. Electra invites Clytemnestra to her house on a pretext where, despite Clytemnestra explaining to Electra her reasons for killing her husband and apologising for her actions towards Electra, Electra enables Orestes to stab Clytemnestra to death. At the end, the siblings feel remorseful and realise that they will be social outcasts for their action. They depart in different directions.

Cast 
 Irene Papas as Elektra
 Giannis Fertis as Orestes
 Aleka Katselli as Klytaemnistra
 Manos Katrakis as the tutor
 Notis Peryalis as Elektra's husband
 Fivos Razi as Aegisthus
 Takis Emmanuel as Pylades
 Theano Ioannidou as chorus leader
 Theodoros Dimitriou (Theodore Demetriou) as Agamemnon 
 Elsie Pittas as young Elektra
 Petros Ampelas as young Orestes

Awards
The film was entered into the 1962 Cannes Film Festival where it won the award of Best Cinematic Transposition. The film was also nominated for the Academy Award for Best Foreign Language Film. The film also won three awards in Thessaloniki Film Festival, for best film and best director (Michalis Cacoyannis) and best actress (Irene Papas).

DVD
Electra was released on DVD by MGM Home Entertainment on March 5, 2002 as a Region 1 DVD.

See also
 List of historical drama films
 Greek mythology in popular culture
 List of submissions to the 35th Academy Awards for Best Foreign Language Film
 List of Greek submissions for the Academy Award for Best Foreign Language Film

References

External links
 
 
 

1962 films
1962 drama films
Greek drama films
1960s Greek-language films
Greek black-and-white films
Films based on ancient Greek plays
Films based on works by Euripides
Films based on classical mythology
Films set in ancient Greece
Films set in Greece
Films set in the 12th century BC
Films directed by Michael Cacoyannis
Films scored by Mikis Theodorakis
Agamemnon